Banguingui, also known as Sama Banguingui or Samal Banguingui (alternative spellings include Bangingi’, Bangingi, Banguingui, Balanguingui, and Balangingi) is a distinct ethnolinguistic group native to Balanguingui Island but also dispersed throughout the Greater Sulu Archipelago and southern and western coastal regions of the Zamboanga Peninsula in Mindanao, Philippines. They are one of the ethnic groups usually collectively known as the Sama-Bajau peoples.

People
The Banguingui are not officially recognized by law either in the Philippines or in the neighboring Malaysian state of Sabah.

The Banguingui language has both written and oral traditions. Its written language is in Jawi script and is fast becoming a dying tradition. Oral traditions are handed down by the kamattoahan (elders) to the kaanakan or anak baha-u (new generations).

The Banguingui built kuta (forts) throughout the Sulu Archipelago. Like their other Sama cousins, they sailed various ships like the vinta, salisipan, or bangka-bangka throughout the Sulu-Sulawesi region. At the height of the Sulu Sultanate, the Banguingui, along with the Iranun people, formed the bulk of the Sultan's navy, leading coastal raids against settlements in the northern Philippines, as well as the coasts of neighboring Borneo, Sulawesi, and the Maluku Islands. They were also heavily involved in piracy and the slave trade during the 18th and 19th centuries. The Banguingui usually sailed garay warships, in contrast to the lanong of the Iranun.

Notable Banguingui
Maas Alidji – a mariner in the service of the Sultan who gain fame during a battle in Brunei Bay.
Maas Arolas Tulawie – one time governor of the Province of Sulu and patriarch of the Tulawie Clan. His descendants include some of the political leaders in the province. Their bailiwick is the Municipality of Talipao in the eastern region of Jolo Island.
Imam Jai Dionga – First cousin of Maas Arolas Tulawie and headman (i.e. barrio captain) of Buan Island in the Province of Tawi-Tawi for more than three decades. He is well respected by Tausug, Bajau and Sama alike. He was one time Vice Mayor of the Municipality of Balimbing (now Panglima Sugala).
Panglima Alip - Progenitor of the Tulawies of Sulu and Diongas of Tawi-Tawi, was overlord of Tongkil in the 19th century reporting directly to the Sultan of Sulu.

See also
Spanish expedition to Balanguingui
Ethnic groups in the Philippines
Iranun people
Garay (ship)
Karakoa

References

Ethnic groups in Mindanao
Muslim communities of the Philippines
Moro ethnic groups